Phyllonorycter gato is a moth of the family Gracillariidae. It is found in south-western Rwanda in open clearings in montane wet forests at an altitude of about 1,800 meters.

The length of the forewings is 2.9 mm. The forewing ground colour is ochreous with white markings and the hindwings are greyish beige. Adults are on wing in early August.

The larvae feed on an unidentified low shrub.

Etymology

References

Moths described in 2012
gato
Moths of Africa

Taxa named by Jurate de Prins
Lepidoptera of Rwanda